Kalakeri is a village in Bijapur of Karnataka, India.

References

Villages in Bijapur district, Karnataka